Loretta Ann P. "Etta" Rosales (born August 17, 1939) is a Filipina activist, teacher and politician who has served three terms as the party-list representative of the Akbayan Citizens' Action Party to the Philippines' House of Representatives from the 11th-14th Congress (1998-2007). She was the Chairperson of the Commission on Human Rights of the Republic of the Philippines from 2010 to 2015.

She is a well-known defender of human rights and was instrumental in instituting a class action suit in the Hawaii District Court which resulted in the only judgment holding the former dictator Ferdinand E. Marcos liable for gross human rights violations committed during his incumbency, which judgment was partially executed in 2011. She herself is a victim of human rights violations by the Marcos regime.

As an activist, she founded the leftist and now party-list Alliance of Concerned Teacher (ACT). She was also the chairperson of Partido ng Bayan. She joined Akbayan in 1998, formed the Akbayan Citizens' Action Party, better known as Akbayan. She was elected as a congresswoman for that party list from 1998 to 2007.

After serving in Congress for three terms, she served as Co-Chairperson of the Philippine Coalition for the International Criminal Court and founded Building Bridges for Peace, a multi-sectoral initiative to secure land rights and security for agrarian reform and indigenous communities through dialogue.

In 2010, she was the possible choice of President Benigno S. Aquino III to head the country's Commission on Human Rights as a replacement to Leila de Lima, who became the Justice Secretary of the country. Many left-wing organizations, such as Karapatan and the Bagong Alyansang Makabayan (Bayan) (a group she was formerly aligned with), protested her appointment, stating that she was unfit for the position. 

Rosales is a known critic of the regime of Gloria Macapagal Arroyo and has often led her party list in protests in opposition to it. Risa Hontiveros, a colleague in Akbayan, welcomed her appointment. She was appointed Commission on Human Rights Chairperson on September 1, 2010. As CHR Chairperson, she also served as Chairperson of the Southeast Asia National Human Rights Institutions Forum, the regional network of national human rights institutions in ASEAN.

In November 2017, the Germany-based Progressive Alliance cited Rosales for her contribution to human rights in the Philippines and for political courage. She was the first recipient of the award.

References

Filipino activists
Filipino schoolteachers
Filipino Roman Catholics
Women members of the House of Representatives of the Philippines
Living people
Members of the House of Representatives of the Philippines for Akbayan
1938 births
Chairpersons of the Commission on Human Rights of the Philippines
Benigno Aquino III administration personnel
Marcos martial law victims